Hermann Josef Abs (born 15 October 1901 in Bonn – died 5 February 1994 in Bad Soden) was a leading German banker and advisor to Chancellor Adenauer. He was a member of the board of directors of Deutsche Bank from 1938 to 1945, as well as of 44 other companies, including IG Farben. As the most powerful commercial banker of the Third Reich, he was, according to economic journalist Adam LeBor, "the lynchpin of the continent wide plunder". The Allies arrested him in January 1946; however, British intervention got him freed after three months, and German courts later dropped all charges. 

He was chairman of Deutsche Bank, and contributed to the reconstruction of the German economy. He chaired the German credit facility that distributed the counterpart funds created by the Marshall plan. Working closely with Chancellor Konrad Adenauer, he was a leader in rebuilding heavy industry, and helped draft the investment policy for basic industries in 1952. He played a major diplomatic role in resolving the prewar German debts at the London War Debt Agreement of 1953. In 1953 he negotiated the restitution to Israel and individual Jews for the Holocaust.

Controversies 
In 1974, the artist Hans Haacke revealed Abs role in the Nazi regime in a project for the exhibition Manet-PROJEKT '74' which detailed, in ten panels, the ownership history of Édouard Manet's Bunch of Asparagus (1880).  The Wallraf-Richartz Museum rejected the Haacke display.

References

Other sources
Hermann J. Abs, in Encyclopædia Britannica online
 Obituary: Hermann Abs
 

1901 births
1994 deaths
Deutsche Bank people
German bankers
German chairpersons of corporations
Grand Crosses 1st class of the Order of Merit of the Federal Republic of Germany
Businesspeople from Bonn